Edward William Brydges Willyams (5 November 1834 – 10 October 1916) was a Liberal MP, successively for three Cornish constituencies. In 1892, he was appointed High Sheriff of Cornwall.

Life
Willyams was born 6 November 1834, the son of Humphry Willyams (1792–1822), a banker, land-owner and Liberal elector of Truro and Ellen Frances Brydges Neynoe, his wife. She was the daughter of Colonel William Brydges Neynoe of Castle Neynoe, County Sligo.

His older brother, James Willyams died aged 38 in 1861.

His aunt by marriage Sarah Brydges Willyams, was an heiress, who married his father's elder brother James (1772–1820) and had no children.  However, when she died in 1863, she gave three-quarters of her fortune to Benjamin Disraeli, a great friend of hers and she was interred next to him in the Disraeli vault at Hughenden, Buckinghamshire.

Willyams was educated at Merton College, Oxford.

He was married twice, first to Jane, youngest daughter of Sir Trevor Wheler, Bt. on 26 June 1856 and then on 5 June 1882 to Emily, a daughter of Sir Joseph Moses Levy, the proprietor of The Daily Telegraph, which then supported the Liberal Party. Emily Brydges Willyams died 5 February 1902.

He died on Tuesday, 10 October 1916, at his seat, Carnanton House, St Columb Major.

Parliamentary service
MP for Truro from 1857 to 1859.
MP for East Cornwall, 1868–1874.
MP for Truro, 1880–1885.

He stood for election at St Austell in 1887, as a Liberal Unionist but was defeated by the Gladstonian candidate, and at the Truro by-election in 1878 he lost to the Conservative candidate Arthur Tremayne.

Interests
He was a keen supporter of the old Cornish sport of hurling. Racing reports in The Times from 1884 to 1910 show his ownership of several race-horses, during this period.

Difficulties
He was the co-respondent in a divorce in 1871/72, having carried on an affair with Lady Jolliffe, the wife of Captain Jolliffe, MP for Wells. He did not stand at the General Election in 1874.

Olive Willyams, the wife of his heir, Arthur Hugh Vivien Willyams, tried to obtain £4,000 from him, using promissory notes that he claimed were forged by her. She was committed to prison for three years and "was afterwards declared to have become insane.

Notes and references

Sources
 Obituary of Edward Brydges Willyams in The Times, Thursday, 12 Oct 1916; pg. 11; Issue 41296; column E.
 Edwin Jaggard Cornwall Politics in the Age of Reform 1790–1855, Royal Historical Society/Boydell Press, (1999), Chapter 6–8.

External links

 

1834 births
1916 deaths
UK MPs 1857–1859
UK MPs 1868–1874
UK MPs 1880–1885
Liberal Party (UK) MPs for English constituencies
Members of the Parliament of the United Kingdom for constituencies in Cornwall
Politicians from Cornwall
Alumni of Merton College, Oxford
British racehorse owners and breeders
High Sheriffs of Cornwall
People from Truro
Liberal Unionist Party parliamentary candidates
19th-century English politicians